Vassily Anatolyevich Solomin (5 January 1953, in Perm – 28 December 1997, in Perm) was a boxer who represented the Soviet Union at the 1976 Summer Olympics in Montreal, Quebec, Canada. There, he won a bronze medal in the lightweight division (– 60 kg), after being beaten in the semifinals by Romania's eventual silver medalist Simion Cuţov.

Solomin began training under Yuri Podshivalov in 1969 at Trudovye Rezervy in Perm. He won the world title at the inaugural 1974 World Amateur Boxing Championships in Havana, Cuba. From 1975 he represented the Armed Forces sports society.  He was coached by Viktor Ageev.

1976 Olympic results 
Below are the results of Vassily Solomin, a boxer who competed in the lightweight division at the 1976 Montreal Olympics:

 Round of 64: bye
 Round of 32: Defeated Hans-Henrik Palm (Denmark) by decision, 5-0
 Round of 16: Defeated Bogdan Gajda (Poland) by decision, 5-0
 Quarterfinal: Defeated András Botos (Hungary) by decision, 5-0
 Semifinal: Lost to Simion Cuţov (Romania) by decision, 0-5 (was awarded bronze medal)

References

External links
 databaseOlympics

1953 births
1998 deaths
Soviet male boxers
Lightweight boxers
Boxers at the 1972 Summer Olympics
Boxers at the 1976 Summer Olympics
Olympic boxers of the Soviet Union
Olympic bronze medalists for the Soviet Union
Sportspeople from Perm, Russia
Olympic medalists in boxing
Russian male boxers
Deaths from lung cancer
AIBA World Boxing Championships medalists
Medalists at the 1976 Summer Olympics